Brian Treanor is the current Casassa Chair in Social Values, Professor of Philosophy in the Bellarmine College of Liberal Arts and the academic director of the Academy of Catholic Thought & Imagination at Loyola Marymount University. He received his Ph.D. from Boston College where he studied with Richard Kearney & Jacques Taminiaux.

Early life 

Brian Treanor was born in California. He completed his undergraduate degree in political science at University of California, Los Angeles and attended both California State University, Long Beach and Boston College for his graduate work.

Research 
Treanor's research is in the area of philosophical hermeneutics, with significant focus on environmental philosophy, philosophy of religion, and ethics. He is the author or editor of six books:

 Carnal Hermeneutics, co-edited with Richard Kearney (New York: Fordham University Press, 2015)
 Being in Creation: Human Responsibility in an Endangered World, co-edited with Bruce Benson and Norman Wirzba (New York: Fordham University Press, 2015)
 Emplotting Virtue: A Narrative Approach to Environmental Virtue Ethics (Albany, NY: SUNY Press, 2014)
 Interpreting Nature: The Emerging Field of Environmental Hermeneutics, co-edited with Forrest Clingerman, Martin Drenthen, and David Utsler (New York: Fordham University Press, 2013)
 A Passion for the Possible: Thinking with Paul Ricoeur, co-edited with Henry Isaac Venema (New York: Fordham University Press, 2010)
 Aspects of Alterity: Levinas, Marcel and the Contemporary Debate (New York: Fordham University Press, 2006)

He has also written numerous article related to his field.

Teaching and administrative work 
Treanor is an advocate for liberal arts education. He as worked regularly in LMU's core curriculum, including founding a Great Books Learning Community. He was the founding director of the Environmental Studies program, and the founding director of the Academy of Catholic Thought and Imagination.

Awards 

Treanor has been honored by the Associated Students of LMU as Teacher of the Year twice, and in 2011, was given the President’s Fritz B. Burns Teaching Award, the university’s highest honor.

References

External links 
 Academy of Catholic Thought and Imagination

Living people
Year of birth missing (living people)
Loyola Marymount University faculty
Place of birth missing (living people)
University of California, Los Angeles alumni
Boston College alumni
People from California
California State University, Long Beach alumni